Ochropleura is a genus of moths of the family Noctuidae described by Jacob Hübner in 1821.

Species
 Ochropleura carthalina (Christoph, 1893)
 Ochropleura clarivena (Püngeler, 1900)
 Ochropleura costalis Moore, 1867
 Ochropleura creatochroa Krüger, 2005
 Ochropleura danilevskyi Shchetkin, 1965
 Ochropleura debtera Laporte, 1977
 Ochropleura distriata Krüger, 2005
 Ochropleura draesekei (Corti, 1928)
 Ochropleura elbursica (Draudt, 1937)
 Ochropleura elevata Viette, 1958
 Ochropleura gaedei Berio, 1972
 Ochropleura geochroides Boursin, 1948
 Ochropleura ignota Swinhoe, 1889 (possibly a synonym for Ochropleura plecta)
 Ochropleura implecta Lafontaine, 1998
 Ochropleura leucogaster (Freyer, 1831)
 Ochropleura marojejy Viette, 1961
 Ochropleura megaplecta (de Joannis, 1932)
 Ochropleura mentaxys Berio, 1972
 Ochropleura ngariensis Chen, 1982
 Ochropleura nivisparsa (Butler, 1889)
 Ochropleura plecta Linnaeus, 1761 – flame shoulder
 Ochropleura portieri Viette, 1967
 Ochropleura pseudogaster Berio, 1974
 Ochropleura reductistriga Krüger, 2005
 Ochropleura rufulana Laporte, 1973
 Ochropleura senescens (Berio, 1962)
 Ochropleura sidamona Laporte, 1977
 Ochropleura spinosoides Poole, 1989
 Ochropleura subplumbea (Staudinger, 1895)
 Ochropleura vicaria Walker, 1857
 Ochropleura vietteana Plante, 1979
 Ochropleura viettei D. S. Fletcher, 1961

References

 
Noctuinae